The Dr. Ambedkar Nagar–Kamakhya Weekly Express is an Express train belonging to Western Railway zone that runs between  of Madhya Pradesh and  of Assam in India. It is currently being operated with 19305/19306 train numbers on a weekly basis.

Coach composition

The train has standard LHB rakes with max speed of 110 kmph. The train consists of 22 coaches :

 1 AC II Tier
 3 AC III Tier
 11 Sleeper class
 4 General Unreserved
 1 Pantry car
 2 End-on Generator

Service

19305/ Indore–Kamakhya Weekly Express has an average speed of 47 km/hr and covers 2271 km in 47 hrs 50 mins.
19306/ Kamakhya–Indore Weekly Express has an average speed of 48 km/hr and covers 2271 km in 47 hrs 40 mins.

Route and halts 

The important halts of the train are:

MADHYA PRADESH

Schedule

Rake sharing

The train shares its rake with 12923/12924 Dr. Ambedkar Nagar–Nagpur Superfast Express.

Direction reversal 

Train reverses its direction 1 times:

Traction 

After Katihar Junction, both trains are hauled by a Siliguri Loco Shed-based WDP-4D or WDP-4B or WDP-4 diesel locomotive up to Kamakhya Junction, and vice versa.

See also 

 Indore Junction railway station
 Guwahati railway station
 Shipra Express
 Indore–Patna Express
 Dr. Ambedkar Nagar–Nagpur Superfast Express.

Notes

References

External links 

 19305/Indore–Kamakhya Weekly Express
 19306/Kamakhya–Indore Weekly Express

Transport in Mhow
Transport in Guwahati
Express trains in India
Rail transport in Madhya Pradesh
Rail transport in Uttar Pradesh
Rail transport in Bihar
Rail transport in West Bengal
Rail transport in Assam
Railway services introduced in 2017